North Ray crater is a small crater in the Descartes Highlands of the Moon visited by the astronauts of Apollo 16.  The name of the crater was formally adopted by the IAU in 1973. It is the largest crater sampled by astronauts during the Apollo program.

The Apollo 16 Lunar Module (LM) Orion landed between North Ray and South Ray craters on April 21, 1972.  The astronauts John Young and Charles Duke explored the area between the craters over the course of three EVAs using a Lunar Roving Vehicle, or rover.  They visited North Ray on EVA 3, at station 11, about 4.4 km north of the landing site.  On the way, they drove along the rim of the similar sized but older crater Palmetto, which is approximately 3 km south of North Ray.

North Ray crater is approximately 1 km in diameter and approximately 240 m deep.  The astronauts observed that the upper 50 m of the slope is gentle, but that it becomes steep below 50 m, and they could not observe the bottom. The inner slopes are covered by boulders up to 5 m across.  A huge (10 m high x 20 m long) boulder, known as House Rock, lies near the southeastern rim.  A smaller boulder that is almost certainly a fragment of House Rock is officially known as South Boulder, but unofficially known as Outhouse Rock.  The ray system, which can be seen from orbit, was not obvious on the ground.

North Ray cuts into the Cayley Formation of Imbrian age, but the crater itself is much younger, of Copernican age, based on the presence of rays.  (See also section on age below.)

Gallery

Age

Based on sample 67955, a noritic anorthosite collected from Outhouse Rock, the impact that created North Ray crater was about 50 million year ago.  This is based on the measured duration of the rock's exposure to cosmic rays.  The rock itself is dated at 4.20 ± 0.07 b.y. by Sm/Nd radiometric dating.

Samples

The following samples were collected from North Ray Crater (Station 11), as listed in Table 6-II of the Apollo 16 Preliminary Science Report, which does not include samples smaller than 25 g weight (of which there were many). Sample type, lithology, and descriptions are from the Lunar Sample Atlas of the Lunar and Planetary Institute.

External links
 Geology of North Ray Crater, Section D2 of Geological Survey Professional Paper 1048, by George E. Ulrich.  1981.
 Apollo 16 Traverses, 78D2S2(25), Lunar and Planetary Institute

References

Apollo 16
Impact craters on the Moon